Gesias Cavalcante (born July 6, 1983) is a Brazilian professional mixed martial artist currently competing in the Lightweight division. He was the 2006 and 2007 K-1 HERO Middleweight Champion, and has also fought for Strikeforce, DREAM, Shooto, World Series of Fighting, and Cage Rage. Cavalcante also participated in the Dynamite!! USA event.

Mixed martial arts career
While Cavalcante is primarily an MMA fighter, he made his K-1 debut fighting against Masato in the 2007 World Max tournament, losing via decision.

On September 17, 2007, Cavalcante won the K-1 HERO'S' 2007 Middleweight (70 kg) tournament by defeating Brazilian jiu-jitsu specialist Vítor Ribeiro by TKO in the first round and Andre Amade by submission via armbar in the finals.

Cavalcante had agreed to fight former PRIDE Fighting Championship Lightweight standout Shinya Aoki at Yarennoka! but withdrew from the fight due to a knee ligament injury. The match was rescheduled for March 15, 2008 at Dream 1 to kick off the new DREAM promotion at the Saitama Super Arena.

Early in the first round, the referee stopped the action when Cavalcante apparently landed illegal elbow strikes to the back of Aoki's neck. The ringside doctor announced that Aoki was unable to continue due to the injury and Cavalcante apologized for the incident. The fight resulted in a no contest. Elbow strikes to the neck and spine area are illegal under DREAM rules. Aoki was later found to have sustained concussion of the cervical vertebra.

They had their rematch on April 29, 2008 at Dream 2. Cavalcante was defeated by Aoki by unanimous decision.  However, he sustained a severely bruised rib and tore cartilage in his costal area during the match.

Cavalcante's next fight was set to be against Joachim Hansen at Dynamite!! 2008 on December 31, 2008, but the bout was canceled the day of the event due to Hansen not passing pre-fight medicals and subsequently being hospitalized for a "head injury".

Strikeforce
Cavalcante signed a 4-fight deal with Strikeforce in June 2010. He made his debut against former Strikeforce Lightweight Champion Josh Thomson, losing by a controversial unanimous decision.

Cavalcante's next fight was against lightweight prospect Justin Wilcox at Strikeforce: Overeem vs. Werdum. The fight ended in a no contest after Cavalcante poked Wilcox's eye.

Cavalcante fought Bobby Green on July 30, 2011 at Strikeforce: Fedor vs. Henderson. He won the fight via split decision.

On the 19th of May 2012, he lost a split decision to Isaac Vallie-Flagg at Strikeforce: Barnett vs. Cormier and was subsequently released from Strikeforce.

On June 30, 2012, Cavalcante was knocked out for the first time in his seven-year career by Luis Palomino at CFA 07 in Coral Gables, Florida.

Kickboxing
He competed at the Shoot Boxing World Tournament 2012 in Tokyo, Japan on November 17, 2012. The Shoot Boxing World Tournament, or "S-Cup", is an eight-man, 70 kg/154 lb standing vale tudo tournament that combines striking, throws and submissions held by the Shoot Boxing Association once every two years. Cavalcante was drawn against Hiroki Shishido at the quarter-final stage and lost by majority decision.

He signed with the Glory kickboxing promotion in August 2013. Cavalcante was set to face Steve Moxon at Glory 11: Chicago - Heavyweight World Championship Tournament in Hoffman Estates, Illinois, US on October 12, 2013 but withdrew due to a lingering hand injury and was replaced by Reece McAllister.

World Series of Fighting
Cavalcante faced off against UFC veteran TJ O'Brien at WSOF 1: Arlovski vs. Cole. He won by submission due to an Achilles lock only 63 seconds into the fight.

JZ next fought undefeated Justin Gaethje at WSOF 2. Cavalcante suffered a deep cut  on the hairline due to a knee from Gaethje that forced the referee to stop the fight at 2:27 of the opening round.

In his third fight for the promotion, Cavalcante took on Strikeforce and 14 time UFC veteran Tyson Griffin at WSOF 4. After a back and forth fight, early in the third round Cavalcante took down an exhausted Griffin and proceeded to land a barrage of undefended punches from the back mount thus winning the fight via TKO.

Cavalcante was scheduled to rematch Justin Gaethje for the inaugural WSOF Lightweight Championship at WSOF 8 on January 18, 2014 in Hollywood, Florida but pulled out due to an undisclosed injury.

Cavalcante faced Melvin Guillard on July 5, 2014 at WSOF 11. He lost the fight via TKO in the second round.

Hawn came out of retirement to face Rick Hawn on October 21, 2022 at Combat FC 2. He won the bout via guillotine choke in the second round.

Championships and accomplishments
K-1 HERO's
K-1 HERO's 2006 Middleweight Grand Prix Championship
K-1 HERO's 2007 Middleweight Grand Prix Championship
Shooto
Shooto Americas Welterweight Championship (1 Time, First, Last)
Titan Fighting Championship
Titan FC Lightweight Championship (1 Time)

Kickboxing record

|-  style="background:#fbb;"
| 2012-11-17 || Loss ||align=left| Hiroki Shishido|| Shoot Boxing World Tournament 2012, Quarter Finals || Tokyo, Japan || Decision (majority) || 3 || 3:00 || 0-2
|-  style="background:#fbb;"
| 2007-06-28 || Loss ||align=left| Masato || K-1 World MAX 2007 World Tournament Final Elimination, First Round || Tokyo, Japan || Decision (unanimous) || 3 || 3:00 || 0-1
|-
| colspan=9 | Legend:

Mixed martial arts record 

|-
|Win
|align=center| 22–12–1 (2)
|Rick Hawn
|Submission (guillotine choke)
|Combat FC 2
|
|align=center|2
|align=center|3:41
|Wilmington, Massachusetts, United States
|
|-
| Loss
| align=center| 21–12–1 (2)
| Erivan Pereira
| TKO (punches)
| Brave CF 11
| 
| align=center| 2
| align=center| 2:21
| Belo Horizonte, Minas Gerais, Brazil
|
|-
| Loss
| align=center| 21–11–1 (2)
| Alan Omer
| TKO (punches)
| Brave CF 9: The Kingdom of Champions
| 
| align=center| 3
| align=center| 3:30
| Isa Town, Bahrain
|
|-
| Loss
| align=center| 21–10–1 (2)
| Kurt Holobaugh
| TKO (punches)
| Titan FC 44
| 
| align=center| 4
| align=center| 2:45
| Pembroke Pines, Florida
| 
|-
| Win
| align=center| 21–9–1 (2)
| Robert Turnquest
| Decision (unanimous)
| Titan FC 42
| 
| align=center| 3
| align=center| 5:00
| Coral Gables, Florida
| 
|-
| Loss
| align=center| 20–9–1 (2)
| Freddy Assuncao
| Technical Submission (guillotine choke)
| Titan FC 40: Cavalcante vs. Assuncao
| 
| align=center| 4
| align=center| 0:24
| Coral Gables, Florida
| 
|-
| Win
| align=center| 20–8–1 (2)
| Pat Healy
| KO (punches)
| Titan FC 39: Cavalcante vs. Healy
| 
| align=center| 1
| align=center| 2:07
| Coral Gables, Florida
| 
|-
| Win
| align=center| 19–8–1 (2)
| Gele Qing
| Submission (unknown)
| KFU: Kungfu Union
| 
| align=center| 1
| align=center| N/A
| Dalian, China
| 
|-
| Loss
| align=center| 18–8–1 (2)
| Melvin Guillard
| TKO (punches and elbows)
| WSOF 11
| 
| align=center| 2
| align=center| 2:36
| Daytona Beach, Florida, United States
| 
|-
| Win
| align=center| 18–7–1 (2)
| Tyson Griffin
| TKO (punches)
| WSOF 4
| 
| align=center| 3
| align=center| 1:37
| Ontario, California, United States
| 
|-
| Loss
| align=center| 17–7–1 (2)
| Justin Gaethje
| TKO (doctor stoppage)
| WSOF 2
| 
| align=center| 1
| align=center| 2:27
| Atlantic City, New Jersey, United States
| 
|-
| Win
| align=center| 17–6–1 (2)
| TJ O'Brien
| Submission (Achilles lock)
| WSOF 1
| 
| align=center| 1
| align=center| 1:03
| Las Vegas, Nevada, United States
| 
|-
| Loss
| align=center| 16–6–1 (2)
| Luis Palomino 
| KO (punches)
| CFA 07: Never Give Up
| 
| align=center| 3
| align=center| 1:41
| Coral Gables, Florida, United States
| 
|-
| Loss
| align=center| 16–5–1 (2)
| Isaac Vallie-Flagg 
| Decision (split)
| Strikeforce: Barnett vs. Cormier
| 
| align=center| 3
| align=center| 5:00
| San Jose, California, United States
| 
|-
| Win
| align=center| 16–4–1 (2)
| Bobby Green
| Decision (split)
| Strikeforce: Fedor vs. Henderson
| 
| align=center| 3
| align=center| 5:00
| Hoffman Estates, Illinois, United States
| 
|-
| NC
| align=center| 15–4–1 (2)
| Justin Wilcox
| NC (accidental eye poke)
| Strikeforce: Overeem vs. Werdum
| 
| align=center| 2
| align=center| 0:31
| Dallas, Texas, United States
| 
|-
| Loss
| align=center| 15–4–1 (1)
| Josh Thomson
| Decision (unanimous)
| Strikeforce: Diaz vs. Noons II
| 
| align=center| 3
| align=center| 5:00
| San Jose, California, United States
| 
|-
| Win
| align=center| 15–3–1 (1)
| Katsunori Kikuno
| Decision (split)
| Dream 15
| 
| align=center| 2
| align=center| 5:00
| Saitama, Japan
| 
|-
| Loss
| align=center| 14–3–1 (1)
| Tatsuya Kawajiri
| Decision (unanimous)
| Dream 9
| 
| align=center| 2
| align=center| 5:00
| Yokohama, Japan
| 
|-
| Loss
| align=center| 14–2–1 (1)
| Shinya Aoki
| Decision (unanimous)
| Dream 2: Middleweight Grand Prix 2008 First Round
| 
| align=center| 2
| align=center| 5:00
| Saitama, Japan
| 
|-
| NC
| align=center| 14–1–1 (1)
| Shinya Aoki
| NC (illegal elbows)
| Dream 1: Lightweight Grand Prix 2008 First Round
| 
| align=center| 1
| align=center| 3:46
| Saitama, Japan
| 
|-
| Win
| align=center| 14–1–1
| Andre Amade
| Submission (armbar)
|rowspan=2| Hero's 10
|rowspan=2| 
| align=center| 1
| align=center| 4:48
|rowspan=2| Yokohama, Japan
| 
|-
| Win
| align=center| 13–1–1
| Vítor Ribeiro
| TKO (punches)
| align=center| 1
| align=center| 0:35
| 
|-
| Win
| align=center| 12–1–1
| Nam Phan
| TKO (punches)
| Dynamite!! USA
| 
| align=center| 1
| align=center| 0:26
| Los Angeles, California, United States
| 
|-
| Win
| align=center| 11–1–1
| Caol Uno
| Decision (majority)
|rowspan=2| Hero's 7
|rowspan=2| 
| align=center| 2
| align=center| 5:00
|rowspan=2| Yokohama, Japan
| 
|-
| Win
| align=center| 10–1–1
| Rani Yahya
| Submission (guillotine choke)
| align=center| 1
| align=center| 0:39
| 
|-
| Win
| align=center| 9–1–1
| Hiroyuki Takaya
| KO (flying knee)
| Hero's 6
| 
| align=center| 1
| align=center| 0:30
| Tokyo, Japan
| 
|-
| Win
| align=center| 8–1–1
| Hidetaka Monma
| TKO (punches)
| Hero's 5
| 
| align=center| 1
| align=center| 2:08
| Tokyo, Japan
| 
|-
| Win
| align=center| 7–1–1
| Michihiro Omigawa
| KO (punches)
| Cage Rage 14
| 
| align=center| 1
| align=center| 0:49
| London, England, United Kingdom
| 
|-
| Draw
| align=center| 6–1–1
| Ryan Schultz
| Draw
| SF 11: Rumble at the Rose Garden
| 
| align=center| 3
| align=center| 5:00
| Portland, Oregon, United States
| 
|-
| Win
| align=center| 6–1
| Henry Matamoros
| Decision (unanimous)
| HOOKnSHOOT: The Return
| 
| align=center| 3
| align=center| 5:00
| Evansville, Indiana, United States
| Won Shooto Americas Welterweight Championship
|-
| Win
| align=center| 5–1
| Cengiz Dana
| Submission (guillotine choke)
| Cage Warriors 9: Xtreme Xmas
| 
| align=center| 3
| align=center| 4:55
| Sheffield, England, United Kingdom
| 
|-
| Win
| align=center| 4–1
| Bart Palaszewski
| Submission (guillotine choke)
| IHC 8: Ethereal
| 
| align=center| 1
| align=center| 1:03
| Hammond, Indiana, United States
| 
|-
| Win
| align=center| 3–1
| Sebastian Korschilgen
| Submission (kimura)
| Shooto: Switzerland 2
| 
| align=center| 1
| align=center| N/A
| Zurich, Switzerland
| 
|-
| Loss
| align=center| 2–1
| Joachim Hansen
| Decision (majority)
| Shooto: 7/16 in Korakuen Hall
| 
| align=center| 3
| align=center| 5:00
| Tokyo, Japan
| 
|-
| Win
| align=center| 2–0
| Brad Mohler
| Submission (achilles lock)
| HOOKnSHOOT: Live
| 
| align=center| 1
| align=center| 1:32
| Evansville, Indiana, United States
| 
|-
| Win
| align=center| 1–0
| Justin Wiesniewski
| Submission (guillotine choke)
| AFC 7
| 
| align=center| 1
| align=center| 1:53
| Fort Lauderdale, Florida, United States
|

Submission grappling record
{| class="wikitable sortable" style="font-size:80%; text-align:left;"
|-
| colspan=8 style="text-align:center;" |  ? Matches, ? Wins, ? Losses, ? Draws
|-
!  Result
!  Rec.
!  Opponent
!  Method
!  text-center| Event
!  Date
!  Location
|-
|  Win ||align=center|6–3–2||  Vinicius de Jesus ||Rear Naked Choke ||Combat Jiu-Jitsu Worlds || June 6 2021 ||  Cancun, Mexico
|-
|  Win ||align=center|5–3–2||  Tom Gallicchio || Arm Triangle Choke ||Combat Jiu-Jitsu Worlds || June 6 2021 ||  Cancun, Mexico
|-
|  Win ||align=center|4–3–2||  Saul Viayra || Heel Hook ||Subversiv 5 || May 1 2021 ||  Miami, Florida, United States 
|-
|  Loss ||align=center|3–3–2||  Jason Rau || Decision ||Fight 2 Win 161 || Januray 21 2021 ||  Miami, Florida, United States 
|-
|  Win ||align=center|3–2–2||  Justin Renick || Decision ||Fight 2 Win 160 || Januray 16 2021 ||  Miami, Florida, United States 
|-
|  Win ||align=center|2–2–2||  Nick Ronan || Decision ||Fight 2 Win 157 || November 14 2020 ||  Philadelphia, United States 
|-
|  Loss ||align=center|1–2–2||  Nicky Ryan || Inside Heel Hook || SubStars: Poirier vs. Tonon || February 21, 2020||  Miami, Florida, United States 
|-
|  Draw ||align=center|1–1–2||  Anthony Smith ||  Decision  || Quintet Ultra || December 12, 2019||  Las Vegas, Nevada, United States 
|-
|  Draw ||align=center|1–1–1||  Chad Mendes ||  Decision || Quintet Ultra || December 12, 2019 ||  Las Vegas, Nevada, United States 
|-
|  Win ||align=center|1–1–0||  Jorge Patino || Guillotine Choke|| Kasai Super Series Orlando || July 4, 2019 ||  Orlando, Florida, United States 
|-
|  Loss ||align=center|0–1–0||  Alireza Noei || Decision · Points|| SFT 9 || January 19, 219 ||  Sao Paulo, Brazil 
|-

See also 
 List of male mixed martial artists

References

External links
 
American Top Team

Living people
Brazilian male mixed martial artists
Brazilian practitioners of Brazilian jiu-jitsu
Brazilian catch wrestlers
Lightweight mixed martial artists
Mixed martial artists utilizing Luta Livre
Mixed martial artists utilizing catch wrestling
Mixed martial artists utilizing Brazilian jiu-jitsu
Brazilian male kickboxers
Middleweight kickboxers
Sportspeople from Rio de Janeiro (city)
Brazilian expatriate sportspeople in the United States
1983 births
People awarded a black belt in Brazilian jiu-jitsu